Michael Stahel Farmer, Baron Farmer (born 17 December 1944) is a British businessman, former treasurer of the Conservative Party, and life peer in the House of Lords.

Early life 
Farmer was born on 17 December 1944 in Tonbridge, Kent, England. His sister, actress Suzan Farmer, died in September 2017. Michael has described how he and his sister had a violent and chaotic early childhood, characterised by 'poverty, neglect and shame.' His father, David Farmer, a metals trader, died due to his alcoholism when he was aged four, while they narrowly avoided being removed from their mother's care due to her own struggle with alcohol.

He was educated at Wantage Grammar School, as a boarder.

Business career 
Farmer started work at eighteen. He began as a difference account clerk and messenger in a London Metal Exchange member firm, earning eight pounds a week, and spent most of his career in the City of London, involved in the trading of base metals, especially copper.

By the late 1980s, Farmer headed the global base metal trading at Phibro Salomon Brothers and in 1999 his trading company, the Metal & Commodity Company Ltd, was floated on the London Stock Exchange under the title MG Plc. He was subsequently a founding partner of the Red Kite Group of hedge funds, which provides mine finance and futures investment opportunities for funds.

Political career

Farmer supported the former leader, David Cameron when he accepted the Centre for Social Justice's Breakthrough Britain report emphasising the wider social repercussions of family breakdown.

On 5 September 2014 Farmer was created a life peer as Baron Farmer, of Bishopsgate in the City of London and in the House of Lords joined the Conservative benches. His maiden speech was about women's homelessness, domestic violence and social exclusion.

He is also a vocal supporter of welfare and prison reform, and was commissioned by the Ministry of Justice (MoJ) to carry out a review of how supporting men in prison to have better family and other relationships can reduce reoffending rates. Following its acceptance of his recommendations, the MoJ commissioned a further review from Lord Farmer on the importance of relationships for female offenders' rehabilitation, which is also being implemented.

The frequency of his speaking appearances, voting record and tabling of written questions is above average in the House of Lords.

As a parliamentarian Farmer has spoken about family hubs and other measures to ensure families who need it receive early help; boosting statutory help for children leaving local authority care; improving children and young people's mental health and wellbeing, including by reducing family breakdown and regulating access to pornography; enabling upwards social mobility and better life chances; and addressing the persecution of Christians in North Korea, the Middle East  and the United Kingdom.

He introduced a Private Member's Bill which would make family impact assessments statutory for all changes to government policy and spending and that would ensure the Government keeps track of family stability rates (the number of children who grow up with both their parents).

He has also been an active and vocal supporter of Brexit.

He was a member of the Select Committee on Social Mobility and the Joint Committee on the Draft Domestic Abuse Bill.

He and Samantha Callan founded the Family Hubs Network in 2019 to support the spread of Family Hubs across the whole of the United Kingdom.

He is a board member of the Conservative Foundation.

Personal life
In 1975, in the City of London, Farmer married Jennifer Potts. They have three children. His son George Farmer, is CEO of the conservative social networking service, Parler and in 2019 married the American political commentator Candace Owens.

Farmer became the Christian deputy chair of the Council of Christians and Jews in 2016.

References

1944 births
Living people
British businesspeople
Conservative Party (UK) life peers
Conservative Party (UK) donors
Life peers created by Elizabeth II